Atash Anbar (also Romanized as Ātash Anbār) is a village in Afshariyeh Rural District, Khorramdasht District, Takestan County, Qazvin Province, Iran. At the 2006 census, its population was 90, in 20 families.

References 

Populated places in Takestan County